The 1927 Chico State Wildcats football team represented Chico State Teachers College—now known as California State University, Chico—as a member of the California Coast Conference (CCC) during the 1927 college football season. Led by fifth-year head coach Art Acker, Chico State compiled an overall record of 6–2 with a mark of 5–1 in conference play, placing second in the CCC. The Wildcats faced  in the CCC championship game, losing 7–0. The team outscored its opponents 164 to 14 for the season. The Wildcats played home games at College Field in Chico, California.

Schedule

References

Chico State
Chico State Wildcats football seasons
Chico State Wildcats football